Jane Fleming or Flemming may refer to: 
 Jane Stanhope, Countess of Harrington (née Fleming; 1755–1824), British society hostess and heiress
 Jane Fleming (producer), American film and television producer
 Jane Flemming (born 1965), Australian Olympic track and field athlete